Robert Bergmann (born 17 February 1905, date of death unknown) was a Czech fencer. He competed in the individual and team épée events at the 1936 Summer Olympics.

References

1905 births
Year of death missing
Czech male fencers
Czechoslovak male fencers
Olympic fencers of Czechoslovakia
Fencers at the 1936 Summer Olympics